Zafrullah Chowdhury (born 27 December 1941) is a Bangladeshi public health activist. He is the founder of Gonoshasthaya Kendra (meaning the People's Health Center in Bengali), a rural healthcare organisation. Dr. Chowdhury is known more for his work in formulating the Bangladesh National Drug Policy in 1982. In 1992, he was awarded the Right Livelihood Award for "..outstanding record of promotion of health and human development."

Early life and career
He spent his early childhood in Kolkata and later his family settled in Bangladesh. He was one of ten children born to his parents. After attending Nabakumar School at Bakshibazar, he studied at Dhaka College. He studied medicine at Dhaka Medical College, where he got involved with leftist political ideologies. As the general secretary of the Dhaka Medical College students' union, he held a press conference to expose the corruption at the hospital. After a turbulent student life, he finished his MBBS degree in 1964 and left for the UK for post-graduate studies in general and vascular surgery. In 1971, he fought for independence during Bangladesh Liberation War.
 
He and Khaled Mosharraf were involved in setting up the Surajmaninagar Hospital a 480-bed Bangladesh Hospital for freedom fighters and the refugees. On May 21, Khaled Mosharraf and Political Adviser of Sector 2 and 3, childhood friend of Zafrullah Chowdhury, R.K. Chowdhury came to the hospital and met Zafrullah Chowdhury. The hospital was run by a team of Bangladeshi doctors, medical students and volunteers. Women with no previous training in healthcare were trained within days to help out the patients. This experience in the field hospital led him to believe that an effective healthcare delivery system can be developed in rural Bangladesh by training women as a primary healthcare delivery platform. This achieved worldwide credibility when it was eventually published in The Lancet.

Gonoshasthaya Kendra

In 1972 Dr. Chowdhury set up the Gonoshasthaya Kendra. The idea was introduced in a concept paper titled, 'Basic Health Care in Rural Bangladesh' in Dhaka. The centre focuses on providing basic healthcare to the rural areas. The centre also runs a university, vocational training centre, agricultural cooperatives, hospital, a printing press, community schools and a generic drug manufacturing plant. Gonoshasthaya Kendra has been very successful in providing family planning services, lowering maternal, infant mortality rates. Though limited in its reach, it pioneered the introduction of cheaper generic drugs. In 1973, Gonoshasthaya Kendra introduced a Rural Healthcare Insurance System, the first of its kind in Bangladesh.

Critiques have pointed out that rather than being national, the centre's reach has been confined to specific areas. However, Zafrullah Chowdhury believes that public health is a state matter, it can never be left to the private sector.

National Drug Policy

Dr. Chowdhury gained prominence by being the driving force in formulating the Bangladesh National Drug Policy in 1982. Before that, 4,000 commercial drugs were available in the market, mostly manufactured by the multi-national companies or imported from abroad. Most of the drugs were out of reach for majority of the people. Some of these drugs were unnecessary and even dangerous whereas the most essential 150 remained in short supply.

National drug policy changed all that. Following WHO guidelines for the developing countries, the policy restricted manufacturing and import of number of drugs to 225. It emphasised manufacturing of generic drugs and manufacturing them locally. The result has been the wider availability of drugs at drastically reduced prices. And today, Bangladesh has turned into a drug exporting country.

Controversy
In 2015, the International Crimes Tribunal, which was set up to try perpetrators of war crimes committed during the Bangladesh Liberation War in 1971, charged Zafrullah Chowdhury on charge of contempt of court and sentenced him to "one hour" of 'confinement in the dock inside the courtroom" and fined him 5000 taka. The court found him guilty of contempt of court for his statement expressing concern over British journalist David Bergman's conviction. This came as a surprise to many as being a freedom fighter, he was one of the vocal supporters of the controversial tribunal.

Awards

 2010 – International Public Health Heroes Award, UC Berkeley, US
 1977 – Independence Day Award, Bangladesh
 1992 – Right Livelihood Award, Sweden
 1985 – Ramon Magsaysay Award for Community Leadership, Philippines
 1974 – Swedish Youth Peace Prize
 2009 - Doctor of Humanitarian Service (DHS), World Organization of Natural Medicine, Toronto, Canada
 2022 - "NRB(Non Resident Bangladeshi) Liberation War Hero 1971" awarded by Voice for Global Bangladeshis, UK.

References 

<7.https://www.kalerkantho.com/online/nrb/2022/03/30/1133729/>

External links
Gonoshasthaya Kendra
Ramon Magsaysay Award Citation

1941 births
Living people
Bangladeshi health activists
Recipients of the Independence Day Award
Bangladeshi public health doctors
Dhaka College alumni
Dhaka Medical College alumni